Mike Kuglitsch (born February 3, 1960) is an American consultant and Republican politician from Waukesha County, Wisconsin.  He was a member of the Wisconsin State Assembly for six terms, representing the 84th district from 2011 through 2022.

Biography

Born in Milwaukee, Wisconsin, Kuglitsch graduated from the University of Wisconsin–Whitewater in 1983. He has held leadership roles in the New Berlin Chamber of Commerce, and the Wisconsin Restaurant Association. He was elected to the Wisconsin State Assembly in 2010. He announced on February 24, 2022, that he would retire.

References

External links
 Official website

1960 births
Living people
University of Wisconsin–Whitewater alumni
21st-century American politicians
People from New Berlin, Wisconsin
Republican Party members of the Wisconsin State Assembly